Lundblad is a Swedish surname. Notable people with the surname include:

Janne Lundblad (1887–1940), Swedish Army officer and equestrian
Peter Lundblad (1950–2015), Swedish singer and songwriter
Thomas Lundblad (born 1967), Swedish fencer
Victoria Lundblad, American geneticist

Swedish-language surnames